TeRra Han plays 'Young San Hue Sang' (2CD) is TeRra Han's court kayageum full version series No.3. Young San Hue Sang (영산회상: 靈山會相) is a Korean court music repertoire originated from Buddhist music. The piece told the Buddha's sermon in Mount Gridhakuta(Youngsan), India, according to Lotus Sutra. After a long period, the piece is now performed instrumentally, TeRra Han plays Young San Hue Sang for solo kayageum in both of two versions, E flat Geomyeon-jo and E flat Pyeong-jo. Young San Hue Sang is performed originally in forms of chamber or large orchestra's music.

Track listing

CD1

CD2

Personnel
Han Terra – Kayageum

References

Han Terra albums
2015 albums